Ali Mustafa may refer to:

Ali F. Mostafa (born 1981), British-Emirati filmmaker, director and producer
Ali Mustafa (cricketer), Pakistani cricketer
Ali Mustafa (footballer), Bruneian football ex-player and coach
Ali Mustafa (journalist) (1984–2014), Pakistani-Canadian photographer and journalist
Ali Mustafa Baghdady (1922–2005), Egyptian Air Force commander
Abu Ali Mustafa (1938–2001), Secretary-General of the Popular Front for the Liberation of Palestine

See also
 Mustafa
 Mustafa Ali (disambiguation)